This is a list of equipment used by the Philippine Air Force (PAF), the branch of the Armed Forces of the Philippines that specializes in aerial warfare. It covers active equipment, such as aircraft, ordnances, air defenses, and retired aircraft inventory.

PAF has made use of its existing equipment to fulfill its mandate while modernization projects are underway. The Republic Act No. 7898 declares the policy of the State to modernize the military to a level where it can effectively and fully perform its constitutional mandate to uphold the sovereignty and preserve the patrimony of the republic. The law, as amended, has set conditions that should be satisfied when the defense department procures major equipment and weapon systems for the air force.

Aircraft

Air defense equipment

Ordnance

Gallery

Retired aircraft

References

Bibliography
 Dorr, Robert F. F-86 Sabre Jet: History of the Sabre and FJ Fury. St. Paul, Minnesota: Motorbooks International Publishers, 1993. .
 Gunston, Bill. Aerei della seconda guerra mondiale (in Italian). Milan: Peruzzo editore, 1984. No ISBN.

External links 
 Philippine Air Force Official Website

Philippine Air Force
Military equipment of the Philippines